Coteau-du-Lac Canal is an 18th-century military canal in Canada located at the junction of the Delisle and Saint Lawrence Rivers in Quebec. The canal was the first work of its kind in North America, and is a National Historic Site of Canada, which also includes the remains of a fort and reconstructed blockhouse. It is located in the town of Coteau-du-Lac in Vaudreuil-Soulanges Regional County Municipality.

History 

The American War of Independence (1775–1783) revealed a number of serious flaws in the British defence system. The western frontier of the Canadian colony was protected by the military outposts on the Great Lakes. However, these outposts were all the more vulnerable for being difficult to reach. Troop and merchandise transport via the Saint Lawrence River was seriously slowed by the rapids located upstream from Montreal. In particular, the rapids at Coteau-du-Lac were the most difficult to get past and skirting the rapids by going inland prolonged supply times. To accelerate shipment of military supplies westward, Governor Frederick Haldimand ordered for a canal to be dug at Coteau-du-Lac.

The construction of the canal at Coteau-du-Lac began in 1779 under the control of Captain William Twiss. The King's Royal Regiment of New York were mobilised to dig the canal.

It was superseded by the original Beauharnois Canal.

Today, water no longer flows around the site or through the canal owing to a drop in water levels due to the building of hydroelectric dams, the building of newer dams, and other modern development.

Legacy
On 28 June 1985 Canada Post issued 'Fort at Coteau-du-Lac' one of the 20 stamps in the "Forts Across Canada Series" (1983). The stamps are perforated  x 13 mm and were printed by Ashton-Potter Limited based on the designs by Rolf P. Harder.

Footnotes

See also
Soulanges Canal - parallel canal built in 1899 to bypass the same rapids

External links

 Parks Canada website
 Official Website of the town of Coteau-du-Lac 
 Canadian Canal Society website 

Canals in Quebec
National Historic Sites in Quebec
Buildings and structures in Montérégie
Tourist attractions in Montérégie
History of Montérégie
Canals opened in 1781
Transport in Vaudreuil-Soulanges Regional County Municipality